Cindy Lee may refer to:

 Cindy Lee (band)
 Cindy Lee (scientist)
 Cindy Lee (businesswoman)
 Cindy Lee (Hong Kong actress)
 Cindy Lee (editor)

See also